Mark Wills is an American country music singer. His discography comprises six studio albums, five compilation albums, one live album, and twenty-four singles. Signed to Mercury Records Nashville in 1996, he has charted nineteen times on the Billboard Hot Country Songs charts (all 16 of his singles signed to Mercury Nashville making the top 40), reaching Number One with "Wish You Were Here" and "19 Somethin'," from 1999 and 2002-2003 respectively. Besides these two songs, he has sent six more into the top ten of the same chart: his 1996 debut single "Jacob's Ladder," 1997's "Places I've Never Been," "I Do (Cherish You)" and "Don't Laugh at Me" from 1998, "She's in Love" from 1999, and a cover version of Brian McKnight's "Back at One" in 2000. "Back at One" is also Wills' only Number One on the Canadian country singles charts.

Of his studio albums, 1998's Wish You Were Here is certified platinum by the Recording Industry Association of America (RIAA), and 2000's Permanently is certified gold. The latter is also his highest-charting album on Top Country Albums, at number 3.

Studio albums

1990s albums

2000s albums

2010s albums

Compilation albums

Singles

1990s

2000s and 2010s

Other singles

Other charted songs

Videography

Music videos

Notes

A^ Permanently also peaked at number 8 on the RPM Country Albums chart.
B^ "Almost Doesn't Count" also peaked at number 38 on the RPM Country Tracks chart.
C^ "Almost Doesn't Count" did not enter the Hot 100, but peaked at number 6 on Bubbling Under Hot 100 Singles, which acts as a 25-song extension of the Hot 100.
D^ "Loving Every Minute" did not enter the Hot 100, but peaked at number 7 on Bubbling Under Hot 100 Singles, which acts as a 25-song extension of the Hot 100.

References

Country music discographies
Discographies of American artists